The 1981 Tour de France was the 68th edition of Tour de France, one of cycling's Grand Tours. The Tour began in Nice with a prologue individual time trial on 25 June and Stage 12a occurred on 8 July with a flat stage to Brussels, Belgium. The race finished on the Champs-Élysées in Paris on 19 July.

Prologue
25 June 1981 — Nice,  (individual time trial)

Stage 1a
26 June 1981 — Nice,

Stage 1b
26 June 1981 — Nice,  (team time trial)

Stage 2
27 June 1981 — Nice to Martigues,

Stage 3
28 June 1981 — Martigues to Narbonne,

Stage 4
29 June 1981 — Narbonne to Carcassonne,  (team time trial)

Stage 5
30 June 1981 — Saint-Gaudens to Pla d'Adet,

Stage 6
1 July 1981 — Nay to Pau,  (individual time trial)

Stage 7
2 July 1981 — Pau to Bordeaux,

Stage 8
3 July 1981 — Rochefort to Nantes,

Stage 9
5 July 1981 — Nantes to Le Mans,

Stage 10
6 July 1981 — Le Mans to Aulnay-sous-Bois,

Stage 11
7 July 1981 — Compiègne to Roubaix,

See also
1981 Tour de France, Stage 12a to Stage 22

References

1981 Tour de France
Tour de France stages